Justin C. Haley (born April 28, 1999) is an American professional stock car racing driver and businessman. He competes full-time in the NASCAR Cup Series, driving the No. 31 Chevrolet Camaro ZL1 for Kaulig Racing, and part-time in the NASCAR Xfinity Series, driving the No. 10 Chevrolet Camaro for Kaulig Racing. He previously went by his nickname J. J. Haley, until he switched to his first name in January 2016 to avoid confusion with fellow competitor J. J. Yeley. Haley owns Dirt Late Model and Dirt Modified Chassis Manufacturer, Darkhorse Racecars.

Haley took a shock win in the 2019 Coke Zero Sugar 400 at Daytona in just his third career Cup Series start due to being in the lead, through pit strategy, under caution when lightning and eventual rain hit the area. After scoring his first Xfinity victory in 2020, Haley became the 32nd driver to win a race in all three NASCAR national touring series.

Racing career
Haley began his racing career at age nine, in Quarter Midgets at Kokomo Quarter Midget Club during the late summer months of 2008. In 2009 and 2010, he scored the KQMC, Indiana State Series and, in 2011, the Light 160 State Championships.

Regional series
In 2014, Haley ran three K&N Pro Series East races, recording a best finish of seventh at Dover International Speedway. The next year, he joined HScott Motorsports to compete full-time in the Pro Series East, competing for Rookie of the Year honors. In 2016, Haley recorded his first career Pro Series East win at Greenville-Pickens Speedway. Haley won his first Pro Series East championship in 2016 after finishing in the top-ten in all 14 races, the only driver to do so in series history.

Truck Series

In 2015, Haley made his Camping World Truck Series debut at Bristol with Braun Motorsports, driving the No. 32 Chevrolet Silverado and finishing 14th. His following Truck race at Martinsville Speedway ended when he was involved in a crash on lap 119. At Phoenix International Raceway, Haley recorded his first top ten, when he finished in seventh. On December 9, 2016, it was announced that Haley would drive the No. 24 truck for GMS Racing in 2017, starting with the third race of the year. 

Haley joined GMS full-time in 2017, driving the No. 24 Silverado. However, Haley missed the first two races – the NextEra Energy Resources 250 at Daytona International Speedway and the Active Pest Control 200 at Atlanta Motor Speedway – due to NASCAR's age restriction. Scott Lagasse Jr. and Alex Bowman replaced Haley at Daytona and Atlanta, respectively. He missed the playoffs and finished 12th in the final point standings. In 2018, he earned his first career win at Gateway in June, locking him into the playoffs for the first time. Haley would get his second win of the season at Canadian Tire Motorsport Park, after leaders Todd Gilliland and Noah Gragson took each other out in the final corner. In Texas, he got his third win after race leader Gilliland ran out of fuel on the last lap. As a result of these two wins, Haley qualified for the playoff finale at Homestead. Haley finished third in the points standings, after finishing 8th at Homestead.

Haley returned to GMS and the Truck Series in July 2020 at Texas.

Xfinity Series

In June 2018, Haley made his NASCAR Xfinity Series debut at Iowa Speedway, driving the No. 23 for GMS Racing while filling for Spencer Gallagher. He would go on to finish 12th.

Haley drove the No. 24 car at Daytona in July 2018 for GMS Racing, where he unofficially won the race ahead of Kyle Larson and Elliott Sadler. However, it was revealed that Haley went below the double yellow line to pass both of the leaders just before the finish line and NASCAR ruled Haley's pass illegal after the race, giving Larson the win, while Haley finished 18th.

On December 1, 2018, it was announced that Haley signed a multi-year deal to drive the No. 11 full-time for Kaulig Racing in 2019, replacing Ryan Truex. He finished second in the 2019 Daytona July race to Kaulig teammate Ross Chastain. Haley qualified for the Xfinity playoffs, but was eliminated after the Round of 8. He ended the 2019 season 12th in points with 20 top tens.

In June 2020, Haley scored his first Xfinity victory at Talladega Superspeedway after starting on the pole and winning the first stage. He became the 32nd driver to win a race in all three NASCAR national series.

On October 19, 2020, Haley and Kaulig announced a third season together in 2021. Haley missed the Dover race in May due to COVID-19 protocols and was replaced by Zane Smith. On August 28, 2021, Haley scored his only victory of the 2021 Xfinity season by winning at the July Daytona race for the second year in a row; this time over teammate A. J. Allmendinger by .023 seconds.

Cup Series

In April 2019, Haley joined Spire Motorsports' No. 77 for his Monster Energy NASCAR Cup Series debut in the GEICO 500 at Talladega Superspeedway. With seven laps remaining, he was collected in a crash with Matt DiBenedetto, Chris Buescher, and Martin Truex Jr., finishing the race in 32nd. He returned to the team at Sonoma Raceway in June, finishing 34th.

For Daytona's 2019 Coke Zero Sugar 400, he qualified 34th. In the race, with around 30 laps to go, Austin Dillon and Clint Bowyer tangled, causing "The Big One". Haley, in 27th, narrowly avoided it and sneaked into 3rd. Race leader Kurt Busch and second-place Landon Cassill would pit under caution but Haley did not, inheriting the lead just before lightning struck near the race track, red-flagging the race. After hours of red flag conditions, the race was called, securing Haley's first Cup win in his third start and Spire's first win in their maiden season. Since Haley was accepting points for the 2019 Xfinity Series, and was not competing full-time in the Cup Series, he was not eligible for the 2019 Cup playoffs.

On January 10, 2020, Kaulig Racing announced Haley would drive for the team at the Daytona 500 in the No. 16. On February 9, Haley made the field by posting the fastest qualifying speed of all the non-charter teams (190.018 mph; 31st overall). After starting 33rd, he was involved in a lap 184 wreck that resulted in a red flag but finished 13th. In July, Haley rejoined Spire for the 2020 NASCAR All-Star Race at Bristol, having qualified via his 2019 Daytona win; he finished 14th.

Haley was offered a contract by Spire for the 2021 NASCAR Cup Series season. When COVID-19 protocols forced him to miss the Drydene 400 at Dover, Josh Berry took over the No. 77. Haley ran 31 races during the season; 30 races for Spire in the No. 77 and one race for Kaulig in the No. 16.

In June 2021, Kaulig Racing announced in junction with going full-time in the Cup Series in 2022 that Haley will race full-time in one of the teams' two charters. On December 15, 2021 Kaulig Racing revealed that Haley will drive the No. 31 entry for the team.

Haley began the 2023 season with a 32nd place finish at the 2023 Daytona 500. On March 15, the No. 31 was served an L2 penalty after unapproved hood louvers were found installed on the car during pre-race inspection at Phoenix; as a result, the team was docked 100 driver and owner points and 10 playoff points. In addition, crew chief Trent Owens was suspended for four races and fined 100,000.

Personal life
Haley is the nephew of Todd Braun, owner of Braun Motorsports. He lives in North Carolina. He is one of four children, with two younger sisters and an older brother.

Haley has gone vegan for stretches of time.

Motorsports career results

Stock car career summary 

† As Haley was a guest driver, he was ineligible for championship points.

NASCAR
(key) (Bold – Pole position awarded by qualifying time. Italics – Pole position earned by points standings or practice time. * – Most laps led.)

Cup Series

Daytona 500

Xfinity Series

Gander RV & Outdoors Truck Series

K&N Pro Series East

K&N Pro Series West

 Season still in progress
 Ineligible for series points

ARCA Racing Series
(key) (Bold – Pole position awarded by qualifying time. Italics – Pole position earned by points standings or practice time. * – Most laps led.)

References

External links

 
 Official profile at Kaulig Racing
 

Living people
1999 births
People from Pulaski County, Indiana
Racing drivers from Indiana
ARCA Menards Series drivers
NASCAR drivers
CARS Tour drivers